Ronald Jonathan Falk, MD, FACP, FASN is the Nan and Hugh Cullman Eminent Professor and Chair of the Department of Medicine at the University of North Carolina-Chapel Hill (UNC). He is a clinical nephrologist and internationally recognized expert in anti-neutrophil cytoplasmic autoantibody (ANCA)-induced vasculitis and autoimmune kidney disease. His career as a translational physician-scientist spans more than three decades. His clinical practice and translational research focus on characterizing the cell, tissue and physiologic changes in the development of specific autoimmune kidney diseases and developing new approaches for studying autoimmunity, inflammation and basic neutrophil/monocyte biology. He was Chief of the UNC Division of Nephrology and Hypertension from 1993-2015. He co-founded the UNC Kidney Center in 2005 and continues as Co-Director. Falk is a Past-President of the American Society of Nephrology (ASN). Since 2015, he has served as Chair of the Department of Medicine at UNC.

Education 
Falk attended college at Dartmouth College in Hanover, New Hampshire where he graduated cum laude with a Bachelor of Arts degree. He received his MD degree at the University of North Carolina-Chapel Hill School of Medicine. He completed his residency in internal medicine and completed a clinical fellowship in nephrology at the University of North Carolina Hospitals. Soon thereafter, he completed a research fellowship in pediatric nephrology at the University of Minnesota Hospitals, in Minneapolis, Minnesota.

Professional Activities 
The American Society of Nephrology was founded in 1966 and is the world’s largest professional society devoted to the study of kidney disease. It is composed of over 16,000 physicians and scientists. The ASN hosts an annual Kidney Week that is attended by more than 13,000 kidney professionals from across the globe. Falk has served in various capacities for ASN, including post-graduate education, finance and nomination committees, as well as Training Program Director. He was elected to the ASN Council in 2006 and served as President of the ASN from 2011-12. During his leadership, he signed a Memorandum of Understanding with Dr. Margaret Hamburg, Commissioner of Food and Drugs for the US Health and Human Services (HHS) Food and Drug Administration (FDA) that formed the Kidney Health Initiative (KHI), and he remains on the KHI Board of Directors. KHI is a public-private partnership between the ASN and (FDA) to help foster the development of new products that will improve the lives of people living with kidney disease. KHI works closely with the FDA Center for Devices and Radiological Health, Center for Drug Evaluation and Research, Center for Biologics Evaluation and Research, and the Center for Food Safety and Applied Nutrition.

In 2012, Falk and Tod Ibrahim co-founded the ASN Foundation for Kidney Research and raised $14 million for the foundation in its inaugural year to administer, protect, and expand its investment in research. The ASN Foundation for Kidney Research Grants Program includes the Student Scholars Grant Program, the Ben J. Lipps Research Fellowship Program, and the Career Development Grants Program. With a mission to “prevent and cure kidney disease through research and innovation,” the ASN Foundation supports investigators ranging from students eager to conduct basic nephrology research in the laboratory to new faculty seeking to establish an independent research program. As a complement to the Student Scholar Grant Program, the Ben J. Lipps Research Fellowship Program funds new and continuing fellows each year to provide researchers early career support to help offset the low national and industry funding rates for kidney disease research.

Falk has served as member or charter member, and has served on or has chaired, a number of National Institutes of Health (NIH) study sections, review and special emphasis panels, and advisory boards since 1997. He also serves as a member of several editorial boards, including those for the Journal of the American Society of Nephrology, Kidney International, and the American College of Physicians’ MKSAP series. He is former chair of the National Kidney Foundation’s council on glomerulonephritis (1995-1998).

For more than 25 years, Falk has served as an author and editor for UpToDate, Inc., a company in the Wolters Kluwer Health division of Wolters Kluwer that was first launched in 1992 by Dr. Burton Rose along with Dr. Joseph Rush. UpToDate is a continuously updated, evidence-based clinical resource that is a primary resource for medical knowledge at the point of care for clinicians around the world. UpToDate is written by a faculty of over 7,100 accomplished physician authors and editors who are renowned leaders in their specialties. It is available both via the internet and offline on personal computers or mobile devices. It requires a subscription for full access.

In 1999, Falk founded the UNC Renal Epidemiology Training Program that has been continuously funded through a National Institutes of Health Ruth L. Kirschstein National Research Service Award (NRSA). The definitive goal of this program is to provide a diverse, thriving training environment for individuals interested in multiple areas of science who will continue their careers to improve kidney health and ultimately prevent disease and restore the health of those suffering from kidney disease. Under Falk's leadership, the training faculty participating in this program have been successful in guiding trainees based on distinct tracks that include postdoctoral public health and epidemiological trainees, postdoctoral translational science trainees, and predoctoral student trainees in public health and in the translational sciences. Under the umbrella of the UNC Kidney Center, training faculty include adult and pediatric nephrologists, pathologists, physiologists, geneticists, epidemiologists, and basic and translational scientists. Nearly 100% of the post- and pre-doctoral trainees on this grant have become independent researchers and outstanding teachers, or have filled positions of leadership in the field of nephrology, including the U.S. Food & Drug Administration.

Soon after his appointment as Chair of the UNC Department of Medicine, Falk established the Physician Scientist Training Program (PSTP). Physician scientists use their knowledge and practical experience treating disease in the clinic to focus basic, translational and clinical research on solving problems related to the health of their patients. The PSTP integrates post-graduate clinical and research training and provides developmental support to transition trainees into independent research careers. Cross-disciplinary research training was designed to take advantage of the close proximity and collaborations between the consistently highly ranked Schools of Medicine, Eshelman School of Pharmacy and Gillings School of Global Public Health.

Research 
Falk's seminal basic and translational research has focused on characterizing the cell, tissue and physiologic changes in the development of specific autoimmune kidney diseases and developing new approaches for studying autoimmunity, inflammation and basic neutrophil/monocyte biology. He has conducted seminal research on the pathogenesis of ANCA-associated vasculitides that affect small- to medium-sized blood vessels. Falk studies kidney diseases caused by anti-neutrophil cytoplasmic autoantibodies, which are a major cause for the most common forms of aggressive glomerulonephritis and systemic vasculitis in adults. ANCA are formed against antigens in the cytoplasm of neutrophil granulocytes (the most common type of white blood cell) and monocytes. Clinical lab tests for ANCA are now common worldwide.

Falk and his colleague J. Charles Jennette, MD, Kenneth M. Brinkhous Distinguished Professor and Chair of UNC Pathology and Laboratory Medicine (1999-2019), authored a landmark 1988 article in the New England Journal of Medicine reporting the discovery of a new class of autoantibodies called myeloperoxidase-specific antineutrophil cytoplasmic autoantibodies (MPO-ANCAs) that cause the most common form of aggressive immune-mediated inflammatory kidney disease.

In the early 1990s, further investigations by Falk and his collaborators revealed that ANCA could actually cause disease. In 1990, his paper in the Proceedings of the National Academy of Sciences first suggested that ANCAs could be pathogenic and described how ANCAs cause substantial injury to endothelial cells that line small blood vessels.

In 1994, Falk and Jennette convened an International Consensus Conference that yielded the Chapel Hill Nomenclature for Small Vessel Vasculitis, which has now been adopted on a worldwide basis. The goals of this conference were to reach consensus on names for the most common forms of vasculitis and construct a specific definition for each. Because of advances in the understanding of vasculitis, nearly two decades later, clinicians and scientists from numerous disciplines were invited to Chapel Hill to revisit the nomenclature and participate in the 15th International Vasculitis & ANCA Workshop. A revised nomenclature for vasculitides was adopted that was considered more relevant and more valuable.

Over the ensuing decade, Falk and his colleagues have more fully documented the pathogenicity of ANCA. In 2002, they demonstrated in a mouse model that passively transferred anti-myeloperoxidase antibodies were capable of inducing pauci-immune necrotizing and crescentic glomerulonephritis. In their research article published in Nature Medicine in 2004, Falk and colleagues proposed a new theory of autoimmunity, called the “theory of autoantigen complementarity,” based on the observation from human studies that patients reacted with complementary peptides to proteinase 3 (PR3) as well as the initial sense peptide. This theory has spawned a series of new observations that investigators are reporting in the literature.

The Falk lab recently identified HLA-DB1*15 as a genetic trait that is a risk factor PR3-ANCA disease in African-American patients with an odds ratio of 73.3 (p=2.3x10-9). They found that a disproportionate number of African America patients carried the DRB1*1501 allele of Caucasian descent, rather than the DRB1*1503 allele of African descent. The DRB1*1501 allele was also significant in Caucasian patients with an odds ratio of 2.2 (p=0.007). In a validation study, supported by the Vasculitis Clinical Research Consortium (VCRC), 7/9 African American PR3-ANCA patients carried a DRB1*15 allele giving an overall odds ratio of 35.9 (p=3.0x10-11) that this allele is a risk factor for this group.

In collaboration with genetic experts at UNC, Falk and his colleagues determined that ANCA autoantigen genes are activated or silenced through epigenetic control, that is, by factors that regulate gene expression without altering the underlying DNA sequence. These observations have a broader impact on numerous autoantibody-mediated diseases. Falk’s seminal work published in the 1988 article in the New England Journal of Medicine described the discovery that ANCA vasculitis is an autoimmune disease with increased expression of the autoantigen genes, myeloperoxidase (MPO) and proteinase 3 (PRTN3) To clarify this, in 2020 Falk and colleagues measured MPO and PRTN3 messenger RNA in monocytes, normal-density neutrophils, and in enriched leukocytes from peripheral blood mononuclear cells. Increased autoantigen gene expression was detected in normal-density neutrophils and enriched leukocytes from patients during active disease compared to healthy individuals. In contrast, normal-density neutrophils were activated by MPO-ANCA and monoclonal anti-PR3 antibody. Normal-density neutrophil activation correlated with MPO and PRTN3 mRNA. Increased autoantigen gene expression originating from the mature low-density and normal-density neutrophils suggests transcriptional dysregulation is a hallmark of ANCA vasculitis. The correlation between autoantigen gene expression and antibody-mediated normal-density neutrophil activation links gene expression to disease pathogenesis.

Treatment of autoimmune diseases has relied on broad immunosuppression. Knowledge of specific interactions between human leukocyte antigen (HLA), the autoantigen, and effector immune cells, provides the foundation for antigen-specific therapies. A study by Falk and colleagues published in 2020 investigated the role of HLA, specific MPO epitopes, CD4+ T cells, and ANCA specificity in shaping the immune response in patients with ANCA vasculitis. A restricted region of MPO that was recognized by both CD4+ T cells and ANCA was identified. This restricted MPO region was targeted by both T cells and antibodies but is not accessible to solvent or chemical modification, indicating that these epitopes are buried. These observations reveal interactions between restricted MPO epitopes and the adaptive immune system within ANCA vasculitis that may inform new antigen-specific therapies in autoimmune disease while providing insight into immunopathogenesis.

Falk and colleagues continue to conduct innovative research that focuses on the basic science and clinical observations of immune mechanisms of glomerular and vascular injury as well as the discovery and development of disease biomarkers. The scholarly products of his research are listed on the NIH U.S. National Library of Medicine, National Center for Biotechnology Information website.

Glomerular Disease Collaborative Network 
In 1985, Falk and Jennette formed the Glomerular Disease Collaborative Network (GDCN) to coordinate kidney disease research by nephrologists throughout the southeastern United States and connect them with the UNC School of Medicine. The GDCN, which consists of more than 600 nephrologists from over 250 private practice nephrology offices, seeks to learn more about how glomerular diseases arise and progress, and ultimately to find the most effective treatment for patients with these diseases. The GDCN has established collaborations and executed consortium agreements with other institutions, industry and foundations. These relationships have resulted in transformative science. Key to the GDCN is its ongoing enrollment and follow-up of patients in 16 specific glomerular disease registries. The registries allow nephrologists to identify patients at the onset of their disease and follow the course of their disease throughout their lifetime. Continual update of patients' medical records and contact information for the registries allows the GDCN to recruit patients for participation in a variety of more focused studies that may include the collection of blood and urine or the completion of questionnaires or telephone interviews. The registry is also used as a recruiting mechanism for treatment studies. The GDCN has initiated or participated in numerous single-center and multicenter clinical trials, epidemiologic studies and a wide range of basic science and translational research projects. These projects have been possible through recruitment from its 16 large glomerular disease patient cohorts. The success of the GDCN helped lay the groundwork for UNC’s involvement as a participating clinical center (PCC) in the CureGN Network. As Principal Investigator for the UNC PCC, Falk is responsible for ensuring robust enrollment, long-term retention and the collection of high quality clinical data and biological specimens among eight clinical sub-sites, including UNC.

Kidney Education Outreach Programs 
Falk organized and continues to conduct a weekly multidisciplinary vasculitis and glomerular disease outpatient clinic that is one of the largest in the United States. In 2005, Falk became co-founder and director of the UNC Kidney Center (UNCKC). The overall mission of the UNCKC is to reduce the burden of chronic kidney disease through discovery about the pathophysiology and therapeutics of the disease; through the development and assessment of educational programs about kidney disease for North Carolinians and their primary care physicians and by providing physicians and citizens access to information about the causes and treatments of kidney disease. The UNCKC provides a multidisciplinary and multi-school approach to research pertaining to kidney disease spanning the gamut from basic molecular biology and genetics to broad epidemiological studies and clinical treatment trials.

Through the Kidney Education Outreach Program (KEOP), Falk launched a patient education outreach campaign in 2006 with the slogan, “Remember to ask: ‘Hey Doc, how are my kidneys?’” Targeted education initiatives include billboard and television media campaigns, community-based interactive information sessions, and the KEOP Filter newsletter. Through the KEOP, the Mobile Outreach Unit has educated and screened almost 6,000 North Carolina citizens in 45 of its 100 counties. KEOP is actively collaborating with other organizations, such as the National Kidney Foundation of North Carolina to ensure a broader reach and expansion of resources, and forming long-term relationships with specific communities and community leaders for future partnership.

In 2008, the UNCKC received a generous donation from Shirley Gilman to create the Allan Brewster Memorial Fund. This fund has been used to expand the KEOP's community-based awareness campaign to increase North Carolinians’ knowledge about the importance of organ donation and the role of kidney transplantation in achieving improved clinical outcomes and quality of life for persons at risk for or experiencing kidney failure. In 2011, UNC opened four kidney pre-transplant satellite clinics in the western and eastern areas of the state. These clinics are conducted in conjunction with local private practices and include a full transplant evaluation by one of UNC’s transplant nephrologists. A nurse practitioner provides education on living donation, pre-emptive transplantation, and the importance of managing comorbidities to optimize transplant outcomes. The overall goal of the satellite clinics is to ensure that every patient interested in a kidney transplant is evaluated and listed.

Using iTunes®, Falk and colleagues in the UNC Kidney Center have recorded many podcasts covering kidney disease topics that are available through iTunes®. Detailed patient education materials about kidney disease have also been developed and are available through the UNC Kidney Center Health Library at https://unckidneycenter.org/kidneyhealthlibrary/.

Awards and honors 
Falk was honored with the first Nan and Hugh Cullman Eminent Professorship in 2016. This endowed professorship was made possible through the Nan O. Cullman Fund for the UNC Kidney Center, an undesignated fund that is tied to research and highest need at the UNC Kidney Center.

In July, 1994 Falk was appointed the Doc J. Thurston Distinguished Professor and was honored as the first Allen Brewster Distinguished Professor of Medicine in 2011. He has been recognized as one of the “Best Doctors in America” every year since 1992 and is the recipient of a number of invited lectureships, including the prestigious Norma Berryhill Distinguished Lecture in 2011. Falk was inducted into the American Society of Clinical Investigation in 1993 and into the American Clinical and Climatologic Association in 2000, when he also received their Theodore E. Woodward Award. He was president of the American Society of Nephrology in 2012. In 2015, he earned National Institutes of Health honors for seminal work as a physician-scientist and delivered the National Institutes of Health Astute Clinician Lecture in 2016. Falk was honored by the New York Academy of Medicine in 2016 with the Edward N. Gibbs Lecture and Award in Nephrology, a lifetime achievement award. In 2017, Falk received the American Society of Nephrology John P. Peters Award in recognition of sustained research contributions to the discipline of nephrology, and his sustained achievements in one or more domains of academic medicine including clinical care, education, and leadership.

Hobbies 
Falk is an avid fly-fisherman. He enjoys salt water as well as fresh water fishing.

References 

American nephrologists
Living people
Year of birth missing (living people)
Physician-scientists